Methylsalicylic acid may refer to:

 3-Methylsalicylic acid
 4-Methylsalicylic acid
 5-Methylsalicylic acid
 6-Methylsalicylic acid
 O-Methylsalicylic acid (o-anisic acid)

See also
 Methyl salicylate